Tokyo Star is Miliyah Kato's third studio album. It was released on April 2, 2008 and has since become her second best selling album, peaking in its second week at #4. It produced four singles, My Girl, Love Is..., Lalala / Futurechecka and 19 Memories.

Track listing

Notes and references 

2008 albums
Miliyah Kato albums